The Politico-Military Group (PMG) is a body of the Common Security and Defence Policy (CSDP) of the European Union (EU) that carries out preparatory work for the Political and Security Committee (PSC). It covers the political aspects of EU military and civil-military issues, including concepts, capabilities and operations and missions.

Tasks
The tasks of the PMG include:
preparing Council conclusions and provides recommendations for the PSC, and monitoring their effective implementation
contributing to the development of horizontal policy and facilitating information exchanges

The PMG has a particular responsibility regarding partnerships with non-EU countries and other organisations, including EU-NATO relations, as well as exercises. The PMG is chaired by a representative of the EU's High Representative.

Role in command and control of missions

See also
Political and Security Committee

References

External links
 

Common Security and Defence Policy bodies of the Council of the European Union